Moonlight Prince is a South Korean television talk show which premiered 22 January 2013 on KBS. It aired its last episode on March 12, 2013. It was succeeded by Our Neighborhood Arts and Physical Education with two of the show's main MCs, Kang Ho Dong and Max Changmin.

History 
The show was first announced on 6 December 2012 as a vehicle for Kang Ho-dong's return to KBS. At the time the show's format and concept were kept under wraps, with the only confirmed detail that it was not a reality variety show. It was also revealed that Kang was in talks with producer Lee Ye-ji of KBS2′s Hello and Sang Sang Plus and writer Moon Eun-ae of MBC′s Infinite Challenge and Knee Drop Guru, and that it would start airing mid-January 2013. KBS said of the show, “It’s different from ‘Star King’ or ‘Knee Drop Guru’, so Kang Ho-dong is very passionate and responsible about it. He has specially requested that the production stay in secret. It’s even difficult for us to let out information that he met the staff.”

On 23 December 2012 S.M. Entertainment confirmed that TVXQ's Max Changmin would be co-MC with Kang for the yet to be revealed show. It marked Changmin's first time, after nine years in the entertainment industry, of being a regular MC  and Kang's official comeback to KBS. It was revealed on January 4, 2013 that the show tentatively titled I Like You, Night of Meeting was to premiere on 22 January, taking over Win Win'''s time slot. It was also revealed that the cast would also consist of Tak Jae-hoon, Jung Jae-hyung, and Brave Brothers. On 9 January it was announced by KBS that the show's title would be changed to Moonlight Prince''. In their statement KBS said, “Originally, the title ‘I Like You, Night of Meeting’, was a working title. After the production staff held a conference, they have decided to go with the fresh title ‘Moonlight Prince’.”

Moonlight Prince held its first closed filming on January 12, 2013. The first guest to be confirmed was Lee Seo-jin.

Format
It was revealed on January 15, 2013 that the show would be a book and theme focused show. The five cast members attended the show's press conference on 16 January in Yeouido, and on 18 January KBS released a teaser of the show.

Each week the featured guest would select a book of his or her own choosing, which would inspire that episode's topics and themes for discussion by the hosts and guests, over the course of the series topics ranged from adolescence to investing. A portion of the proceeds from each week’s episode was donated to a charity of the guest’s choice.

Guests

Ratings 
In the ratings below, the highest rating for the show will in be red, and the lowest rating for the show will be in blue.

References

External links 
  

Korean Broadcasting System original programming
South Korean television talk shows
2013 South Korean television series debuts
Korean-language television shows